Jakob Larsen may refer to:

Jakob Larsen (historian) (1888–1974), American classical scholar
Jakob Larsen (handballer) (born 1974), Greenlandic handballer and manager

See also
Jacob Larsen (disambiguation)